Garfield County is a county in south central Utah, United States. As of the 2010 United States Census the population was 5,172, making it the fifth-least populous county in Utah; with about 0.98 inhabitants per square mile, it is also the least densely populated county in Utah. Its county seat and largest city is Panguitch.

History
The Utah Territory legislature created the county on March 9, 1882, with areas partitioned from Iron County. It was named for James A. Garfield, the twentieth President of the United States, who had died six months earlier. The border with Iron County was adjusted in 1884, and Garfield County's boundaries have remained intact since then.

Geography
The Colorado River, flowing southwestward through a deep gorge, forms the eastern boundary. The Dirty Devil River flows southward through the east end of the county to discharge into Colorado at the county's border. Westward, the cliffs of tributary canyons give way to the barren stretches of the San Rafael Desert, beyond which a variety of mountains, plateaus, and canyons make up the terrain. Most of Bryce Canyon National Park lies in the southwestern part of the county, and the northern half of the Grand Staircase–Escalante National Monument occupies the middle of the county. A large portion of Capitol Reef National Park lies in the east-central part of the county. A very small part of Canyonlands National Park lies in the northeast corner of the county. The terrain of Garfield County is arid, rough, and carved with erosion. The county terrain generally slopes to the south and to the east. The county's highest point is Mount Ellen, in the Henry Mountains, near the county's north border, at 11,522' (3512m) ASL. It is the fifth-largest county in Utah by area.

Airports
 Bryce Canyon Airport (BCE)

Major highways

  US Highway 89
 Utah Highway 12
 Utah Highway 22
 Utah Highway 63
 Utah Highway 95
 Utah Highway 143
 Utah Highway 276

Adjacent counties

 Wayne County - northeast
 San Juan County - east
 Kane County - south
 Iron County - west
 Beaver County - northwest
 Piute County - north

Protected areas

 Bryce Canyon National Park (part)
 Canyonlands National Park (part)
 Capitol Reef National Park (part)
 Carcass Canyon Wilderness Study Area
 Dixie National Forest (part)
 Escalante Petrified Forest
 Fishlake National Forest (part)
 Glen Canyon National Recreation Area (part)
 Grand Staircase–Escalante National Monument (part)
 Mammoth Cave (US Forest Service)

Lakes
 Lake Powell (part)
 Panguitch Lake
 Wide Hollow Reservoir

Demographics

As of the 2000 United States Census, there were 4,735 people, 1,576 households, and 1,199 families in the county. The population density was 0.91/sqmi (0.35/km2). There were 2,767 housing units at an average density of 0.53/sqmi (0.21/km2). The racial makeup of the county was 94.95% White, 0.17% Black or African American, 1.84% Native American, 0.40% Asian, 0.04% Pacific Islander, 1.12% from other races, and 1.48% from two or more races. 2.87% of the population were Hispanic or Latino of any race.

There were 1,576 households, out of which 38.40% had children under 18 living with them, 66.40% were married couples living together, 6.80% had a female householder with no husband present, and 23.90% were non-families. 20.50% of all households were made up of individuals, and 10.10% had someone living alone who was 65 years of age or older. The average household size was 2.92, and the average family size was 3.43.

The county population contained 32.60% under the age of 18, 7.80% from 18 to 24, 23.10% from 25 to 44, 22.40% from 45 to 64, and 14.10% who were 65 years of age or older. The median age was 34 years. For every 100 females, there were 104.60 males. For every 100 females aged 18 and over, there were 102.20 males.

The median income for a household in the county was $35,180, and the median income for a family was $40,192. Males had a median income of $30,239 versus $20,408 for females. The per capita income for the county was $13,439. About 6.10% of families and 8.10% of the population were below the poverty line, including 8.80% of those under age 18 and 10.40% of those aged 65 or over.

 the largest self-identified ancestry groups in Garfield County are:
 English - 46.2%
 German - 14.8%
 Irish - 10.1%
 Danish - 6.6%
 Scottish - 4.9%
 Welsh - 3.9%
 Scotch-Irish - 2.5%
 Swedish - 2.3%
 Norwegian - 2.2%

Politics and Government
Garfield County has traditionally voted Republican. In no national election since 1936 has the county selected the Democratic Party candidate (as of 2020).

Communities

Cities 
 Escalante
 Panguitch (county seat)

Towns
 Antimony
 Bryce Canyon City
 Boulder
 Cannonville
 Hatch
 Henrieville
 Tropic

Unincorporated communities

 Hillsdale
 Ticaboo
 Widtsoe

See also
 
 List of counties in Utah
 National Register of Historic Places listings in Garfield County, Utah

References

External links
 
 

 
1882 establishments in Utah Territory
States and territories established in 1882